Feedback Informed Treatment (FIT) is an empirically supported, pantheoretical approach for evaluating and improving the quality and effectiveness of behavioral health services, originally developed by psychologist Scott D. Miller. It involves routinely and formally soliciting feedback from clients regarding the therapeutic relationship and progress of care and using the resulting information to inform and tailor service delivery.:

FIT utilizes empirically validated, client rated measurement tools at each session. Although any validated measures could be used, due to their brevity, the Outcome Rating Scale (ORS) and Session Rating Scale (SRS) are commonly employed by FIT Practitioners. The ORS measures the client’s therapeutic progress while asking about their level of distress and functioning. The SRS measures the quality of the therapeutic relationship.

A number of studies and meta-analyses have demonstrated the benefit of routinely monitoring and using client outcome data and feedback to inform care.  Studies using the ORS and SRS document:

 Improved client outcomes (27%)
 Increased client retention
 Reduction of deterioration rates (50%)
 Shortening the lengths of time spent in care

Additional Readings 
 Prescott, D. Maeschalck, C & Miller, S.D. (eds.) (2017).  Feedback Informed Treatment in Clinical Practice.  Washington, D.C.: American Psychological Association Press.  .

 Miller, S.D., Hubble, M.A. & Chow, D. (2021).  Better Results: Using Deliberate Practice to Improve Therapeutic Effectiveness.  Washington, D.C.: American Psychological Association Press. .

External links 
 International Center for Clinical Excellence
 FIT Research Studies

References 

Treatment of mental disorders
Feedback